Manish Gupta may refer to:

 Manish Gupta (director), Indian director and writer
 Manish Gupta (politician) (born 1942), Indian politician